Tyaag is a 2004 Bengali action drama film directed by Swapan Saha. It film stars Prosenjit and Rachana Banerjee, with music composed by Ashok Bhadra. The film served as a remake of the Tamil film Chokka Thangam (2003).

Cast 
 Prosenjit Chatterjee as Bijoy Choudhury 
 Rachana Banerjee as Anjali, Bijoy's love interest
 Tapas Paul as Avik, Puja's husband
 Dulal Lahiri
 Rajesh Sharma as Raghu
 Locket Chatterjee as Puja, Bijoy's sister
 Subhasish Mukherjee as Bijoy's maternal uncle
 Piya Sengupta as Rupa, Avik's sister

Soundtrack 
Music: Ashok Bhadra 
Lyrics: Priyo Chatterjee 

"Ei Shubho Dine" - Kumar Sanu, Sadhana Sargam 
"Dure Oi Neel Akash" - Kumar Sanu, Deepmala
"Moner Kotha Bolbo" - Kumar Sanu, Sadhana Sargam 
"Asbe Din Asbe Raat" - Kumar Sanu, Sadhana Sargam, Deepmala

References 

Bengali-language Indian films
2004 films
2000s Bengali-language films
Indian action drama films
2004 action drama films